The Lanjwani are a clan of Rind tribe,  Baloch which is settled in the Sindh, Balochistan and Punjab provinces of Pakistan.

Baloch history

According to Baloch traditions, their ancestors came from Halab, Syria. They are descendants of Ameer Hamza, uncle of Mohammed, who settled in Halab (present-day Aleppo), after the fight against second Umayyad Caliph Yazid I at Karbala in 680, angered descendants of Ameer Hamza wander way to east or southeast of the central Caspian region, specially toward  Sistan,  Iran.
Mir Jalal khan was the ruler and founder of the first Balochi confederacy in 12th century. Mir Jalal Khan left four sons Mir Rind Khan, Mir Lashar Khan, Mir Hoth Khan, Mir Kora Khan and daughter Bibi Jato, who married his nephew Murad. These five are the founders of the five great divisions of the Baloch tribes, the Rind, Lashari, Hoth, Korai and Jatoi. The Rind had been appointed Royal by his father.

Lanjwani history

Lanjo Khan son of Babu Khan Rind Baloch was the name of their ancestor, after whom they are now called Lanjwani. Mir Lanjo Khan left five sons 1) Rais, 2) Karlo, 3) Yar Mohammed, 4) Yousif and 5) Karim Ali. Their descendants now adopted the names Raisani, Kalozi, kalro, Karlu, Yarozai, Yousifzai and Karamzai Lanjwani.

References

Further reading
 Skeikh Sadik Ali Ansari, A short Sketch historical and traditional of the Muslaman races found in Sindh, Balochistan and Afanistan, pages 18, 85, published by Indus Publication Karachi, Pakistan in 1901.
 Khair Mohammed Burrio, Encyclopedia of tribes, published by Murad publication Sehwan sharif page 701.
 Dr. Shahnawaz, Lanjwani, notes on the Lanjwani tribe, page 1-46.
 Dr. Sigrid Westphal-Helibusch and Dr. Heinz, Weslphal, The Jat of Pakistan, published by Lok Virsa, Islamabad, Pakisatan, page 52.
 Olson et al (1994). An Ethnohistorical Dictionary of Russian and Soviet Empires. Greenwood publishing group, page 101.
 Kreyenbroek, Philip G. (2010). Oral literature of Iranian Languages: Kurdish, Pashto, Balochi, Ossetic, Persian and Tajik companion Volume 11 and History of Persian literature Volume 18.
 S.A.J. Shirazi. Heritage Village, Pakistan. Travelers Digest. Overseas Pakistan Foundation. Provinces of Pakistan (Balochistan). Encyclopedia of Pakistan.
 Lonworth Dames, Mansel (1904) The Baloch race, A historical and ethnological sketch. Asiatic Society Monographs Vol 1, Vol, Royal Asiatic Society, Retrieved April 22, 2014.
 Saeed Khan Lanjwani, History of Lanjwani tribes in Punjab papes 1-60.
 Goeje, M. J. de: Contribution to the history of the Gypsies. Koninklijke Akademie Van Wetenschappen of Amsterdam, 1875.
 Postans, T: Personal Observation on Sindh, the manners and customs its inhabitants, London 1843. Journal of the Asiatic Society Of Bengal, X11.
.The Baloch Race,A historical and ethnological sketch by Lonworth Dames, Published by The Royal Asiatic Society,22 Albemarle street,W,1904,page 60-77

Social groups of Pakistan
Baloch tribes